Scuola Italiana Statale di Atene is an Italian international school in Ano Patissia in northern Athens, Greece. Owned by the Italian government, it serves elementary, lower secondary, and liceo (upper secondary) levels.

History
It was officially established in 1956. No later than 1968, was it run as a two-fold school, namely an Italian and a Greek one. In 1968, the two sections were merged and the pupils were educated accordingly to both   the Italian and Greek instructional systems. As a result, they were entitled to hold exams either for the Greek "Apolytirion" and the Italian "Maturità". Until 1972 the headquarters of the School were to be found in the "Casa d'Italia" magnificent building (47, Patission Street). In 1972, however, they were transferred to a Vatican-owned building, former seminar of Roman Catholic clergymen, at Greek capital's fringes (18, Mitsaki Street, Ano Patissia).  In 1974, moreover, two separate sections, that is to say an Italian and a Greek one, were re-established and, at last, in 2015 the Greek section was closed down.

Teachers and students
As of 2015 the school has 27 teachers and 218 students. Most students come from mixed Italian-Greek families. A larger minority are students of nationalities other than Greek or Italian, mostly Albanian students. A smaller minority are Italians temporarily residing in Greece. Another small group are Greek students who had previously lived in Italy and attended local schools there. Teachers include contract teachers, supplemental teachers, and those sent by the Italian Ministry of Foreign Affairs (MAE).

References

A general account is in Scuola Italiana di Atene. Annuario 2006–2007. Cinquantenario.

External links
  Scuola Italiana Statale di Atene
  Scuola Italiana Statale di Atene (old website)

Italian international schools in Europe
International schools in Greece
Schools in Athens
1956 establishments in Greece
Educational institutions established in 1956
Greece–Italy relations